Schaeffler is a German surname. Notable people with the surname include:

Georg F. W. Schaeffler (born 1964), German businessman
Maria-Elisabeth Schaeffler (born 1941), German businesswoman
Willy Schaeffler (1915–1988), German skiing coach

German-language surnames